The Warwick and Leamington by-election was a Parliamentary by-election held on 23 October 1903. The constituency returned one Member of Parliament (MP) to the House of Commons of the United Kingdom, elected by the first past the post voting system.

Electoral history

Result
The Liberal Unionist Party held the seat:

Aftermath
At the following General Election the result was:

References

20th century in Warwickshire
1903 in England
1903 elections in the United Kingdom
By-elections to the Parliament of the United Kingdom in Warwickshire constituencies